The Normal Years is a compilation album of singles, live songs, songs on other compilations, and previously unreleased recordings by indie rock band Built to Spill.

The album consists of songs that were recorded between 1993 and 1995 by various incarnations of the band, although most feature the There's Nothing Wrong with Love lineup.  Doug Martsch is the only person present on all the recordings.  The Normal Years was released in 1996 on K Records.

Track listing
All songs by Doug Martsch, except track 4 by Daniel Johnston and Jad Fair, some lyrics on track 5 by James Christenson
Guitar and vocals by Doug Martsch on all tracks
 "So & So So & So from Wherever Wherever"
Originally appeared on a 1995 Saturnine single, recorded by Calvin Johnson.
Andy Capps – drums
Brett Nelson – bass
 "Shortcut"
Originally appeared on Rotating Tongues, recorded by Todd Dunnigan in late 1992 at Audio Lab in Boise, Idaho.
Ralph Youtz - drums
 "Car"
Originally appeared on Atlas/Face single, recorded by Calvin Johnson in late 1993
Andy Capps – drums
Brett Nelson – bass
 "Some Things Last a Long Time"
 Cover of a Daniel Johnston song.
Supposed to appear on an anti-homophobia compilation, recorded by Ned Evett in January 1994 at Audio Lab, Boise, Idaho
Andy Capps – drums
Brett Netson – bass
Ned Evett – guitar
 "Girl"
Originally appeared on an Atlas/Face single, recorded by Calvin Johnson in late 1993
Andy Capps – drums
Brett Nelson – bass
 "Joyride"
Originally appeared on a K Records single, recorded by Calvin Johnson in late 1993
 "Some"
Recorded live at Chicago Filmmaker in mid-1995, recorded by Aadam Jacobs
Andy Capps – drums
James Bertram – bass
David Schneider – drums
 "Sick & Wrong"
Originally appeared on a K Records single, recorded by Calvin Johnson in late 1993
Andy Capps – drums
Brett Nelson – bass
 "Still Flat"
Originally appeared on Red Hot + Bothered featuring Caustic Resin, recorded by Phil Ek at Audio Lab, Boise, Idaho in January 1995
Tom Romich – bass
Brett Netson – guitar
James Dillion – drums
Todd Dunnigan – trombone
 "Terrible/Perfect"
Originally appeared on a 1995 Saturnine single, recorded by Calvin Johnson.
Andy Capps – drums
Brett Nelson – bass

Additional personnel
John McMahon III – "Unrepresented Built to Spill member"
Erik Payne – Album art
"the bear" – Inspiration
Tina Herschelman – Type & layout
Karena Youtz – Cover photo
Bart Kline – Roadie #1
James Christenson – Roadie #2

References 

Built to Spill albums
1996 compilation albums
K Records compilation albums